Thomas Hammock (born July 7, 1981) is an American football coach. He is the head football coach at Northern Illinois University (NIU), a position he has held since January 2019. Prior to being named the head coach of his alma mater, he served as the running backs coach for the Baltimore Ravens of the National Football League (NFL) from 2014 to 2018.

Biography
A native of Jersey City, New Jersey, Hammock was born on July 7, 1981. He attended Bishop Luers High School in Fort Wayne, Indiana before committing to Northern Illinois University (NIU) where he played running back from 1999 to 2002. Hammock earned his bachelor's degree in marketing from NIU in 2002, and a master's in educational leadership from the University of Wisconsin–Madison in 2004. He and his wife, Cheynnitha, also a NIU alum, have a daughter, Tierra, and a son, Thomas Douglas.

Playing career
As a player, Hammock gained 2,432 rushing yards in 32 games under head coach Joe Novak, which ranks 13th all-time at NIU. Hammock rushed for more than 1,000 yards in each of his sophomore and junior seasons, and was also named a two-time first team CoSIDA Academic All-American in 2000 and 2001. In the first start of his senior season campaign, he rushed for 172 yards on 38 carries to help propel the Huskies to a 42–41 overtime win over Wake Forest. Following the game, however, Hammock experienced shortness of breath and chest discomfort. After a series of tests and following the recommendations from doctors and specialists, he was sidelined the remainder of the season. In December of 2002, shortly after graduating from NIU, he announced his retirement due to a heart-related condition with one season of eligibility remaining.

Coaching career
Hammock began his coaching career at the University of Wisconsin–Madison, serving as a graduate assistant for the Wisconsin Badgers from 2003 to 2004. The following season, he was named the running backs coach at Northern Illinois, reuniting with his former head coach, Joe Novak. In Hammock's first season as running backs coach, Garrett Wolfe rushed for 1,580 yards and 16 touchdowns in just nine games as NIU won the MAC West Division and appeared in the MAC Championship Game for the first time in school history. Hammock then became a member of the Minnesota coaching staff from 2007-2010, first serving as running backs coach before spending his final season as co-offensive coordinator. On February 23, 2011, he was hired as running backs coach for Wisconsin where he coached standouts like Montee Ball, James White and Melvin Gordon until 2014. On February 5, 2014, the Baltimore Ravens hired Hammock as their new running backs coach.

Northern Illinois
On January 18, 2019, Hammock was named the 23rd head football coach at his alma mater, Northern Illinois. In his first season back at NIU, his team finished the season 5–7 overall and 4–4 in Mid-American Conference (MAC) play to tie for third place in the MAC's West Division.

Hammock's second season as head coach was shorted due to the COVID-19 pandemic. Touting a roster that was composed of 71% freshmen, inexperience and youth became additional challenges for an already unprecedented season. The Huskies went winless in six games against conference opponents. However, the season laid a foundation for many freshmen who saw significant playing time. 

On November 9, 2021, Hammock signed a contract extension through the 2026 season.

Head coaching record

References

External links
 Northern Illinois profile

1981 births
Living people
American football running backs
Baltimore Ravens coaches
Northern Illinois Huskies football coaches
Northern Illinois Huskies football players
Minnesota Golden Gophers football coaches
Wisconsin Badgers football coaches
University of Wisconsin–Madison alumni
Players of American football from Jersey City, New Jersey
Players of American football from Fort Wayne, Indiana
Coaches of American football from Indiana
African-American coaches of American football
African-American players of American football